Marie-Line Reynaud (born 17 July 1954 in Barbezieux-Saint-Hilaire, Charente) is a French politician who was a deputy to the National Assembly of France for the second division of Charente départment. She was first elected in 1997, lost her seat in 2002, regained it in 2007, then lost it again in 2017. Between her terms she served as a Member of the European Parliament for the west of France from 2004 to 2007.

Reynaud is a member of the Socialist Party, and sat with the Party of European Socialists in the European Parliament. She was a member of the Parliament's Committee on Constitutional Affairs and its Committee on Women's Rights and Gender Equality. She was also a substitute for the Committee on Civil Liberties, Justice and Home Affairs, a member of the delegation for relations with the Gulf States, including Yemen, and a substitute for the delegation for relations with the Korean Peninsula.

Career
 Master's degree in public law and international and Community law (1979)
 Lawyer at the Information Centre on Women's Rights (1991–1997)
 Member of Jarnac Municipal Council (1989–1995)
 First Deputy Mayor of Jarnac (2002)
 Vice-Chairwoman, Pays de Cognac (2002)
 Member of the National Assembly for the second constituency of Charente (1997–2002)
 Vice-Chairwoman of the Mitterrand Donation, Jarnac (2002)
 Gold Medal of the Society for Promoting Good
 Blood donor's medal

External links
 Official website (in French)
 Assemblée Nationale Biography (in French)
 European Parliament biography
 Declaration of financial interests (in French; PDF file)

1954 births
Living people
People from Charente
MEPs for West France 2004–2009
21st-century women MEPs for France
Socialist Party (France) MEPs
Women members of the National Assembly (France)
Deputies of the 11th National Assembly of the French Fifth Republic
Deputies of the 13th National Assembly of the French Fifth Republic
Deputies of the 14th National Assembly of the French Fifth Republic
20th-century French women